The  2018–19 season will be the 9th season of competitive football by Politehnica Iași, and the 5th consecutive in Liga I. Politehnica Iași will compete in the Liga I and in Cupa României.

Previous season positions

Competitions

Liga I

The Liga I fixture list was announced on 5 July 2018.

Regular season

Table

Results summary

Matches

Relegation round

Table

Results summary

Position by round

Matches

Cupa României

Politehnica Iași will enter the Cupa României at the Round of 32.

See also

 2018–19 Cupa României
 2018–19 Liga I

References

FC Politehnica Iași (2010) seasons
Politehnica Iași